The Abatesco is a French coastal river which flows through the Haute-Corse department and empties into the Tyrrhenian Sea.

Geography

The source is very close to the famous GR20 hiking trail. 
The upper section is called the Tassi torrent.

It first flows from southwest to northeast, then generally flows from west to east. 
It flows into the Tyrrhenian Sea in the commune of Serra-di-Fiumorbo.

Neighboring coastal rivers are the Fiumorbo to the north and the Travo to the south.

Watershed municipalities and cantons

In the Haute-Corse department alone, the Abatesco drains four communes within one canton:

Communes from upstream to downstream are: San-Gavino-di-Fiumorbo (source), Isolaccio-di-Fiumorbo, Prunelli-di-Fiumorbo, Serra-di-Fiumorbo (mouth).
The Abatesco runs through the canton of Prunelli-di-Fiumorbo, the most southerly canton of Haute-Corse, in the arrondissement of Corte.

On almost all of its route, it serves as a boundary for the communes it runs along: Serra-di-Fiumorbo on its right bank, San-Gavino, then Isolaccio and finally Prunelli on its left bank.

Watershed

Managing body

The managing body since passage of the Corsican law of 22 January 2002 has been the Corsican Basin Committee (Comité de bassin de Corse).

Tributaries

The Abastesco has nineteen referenced tributaries:

Strahler number

The Strahler number of the Abatesco river is five from the Biaccino, Anzagara, Minagoli  and Juva tributaries.

Human presence

In the valley, in the places called Abbazia, Agnatello, Calzarello and Catastajo, a whole wood industry was born and prospered, run by the FORTEF company (Forêts - Terres et Forces du Fiumorbo).
It fell into disuse in the nineteenth century.
In these same places, Corsican railways built a large railway bridge.

The old Roman road crossed about  further north-west of this bridge, near the place called Chiarata.

On the river's course there are the Moulin de Branca and the Moulin de Biaccino, while the Moulin de Rizzale is on the Biaccino stream.

Ecology

The river and its tributaries are populated with trout.
A devastating flood for the fish population occurred in September 1989.

The mouth of the river has been classified as a Zone naturelle d'intérêt écologique, faunistique et floristique (ZNIEFF) since 1985 covering , which includes the Canna marshes and the Gradugine pond to the north, and the Palo pond to the south.

Notes

Citations

Sources

Rivers of Haute-Corse
Rivers of France
Drainage basins of the Tyrrhenian Sea